Mniszki may refer to the following places:
Mniszki, Greater Poland Voivodeship (west-central Poland)
Mniszki, Łódź Voivodeship (central Poland)
Mniszki, Warmian-Masurian Voivodeship (north Poland)